Pace of play is an issue concerning college baseball and professional baseball regarding the length of games.

Background
Game length in Major League Baseball (MLB) has increased over time, with the 1988 New York Yankees being the first team to average over three hours per game. From 2004 through 2014, MLB games increased from an average of 2.85 hours to 3.13 hours. This was in spite of decreases in scoring, with MLB teams scoring 4.1 runs per game in 2014, down from 5.14 in 2000.

The amount of time a pitcher takes between pitches directly affects pace of play, and varies widely. For the first half of the 2022 MLB season, the slowest working pitcher was Giovanny Gallegos of the St. Louis Cardinals, who averaged 31.7 seconds between pitches, while the quickest working pitcher was Sam Long of the San Francisco Giants, who averaged 17.9 seconds.

Rules changes
In college baseball, the Southeastern Conference experimented with a 20-second pitch clock during the 2010 season, and the National Collegiate Athletic Association instituted the pitch clock before the 2011 season for when no runners are on base.
During the 2014 season, the Atlantic League of Professional Baseball instituted its own changes. These included using a 12-second pitch clock, reducing timeouts and warm-up pitches, and making intentional walks automatic by signalling the umpire, rather than throwing four intentional balls. The Arizona Fall League began using a pitch clock in 2014 and the Double-A and Triple-A levels of Minor League Baseball followed suit in 2015. Those levels saw a 12-minute reduction in game times.

Towards the end of the 2014 season, Commissioner of Baseball Bud Selig announced the formation of a committee to examine the issue. John Schuerholz chaired the committee, which also included Sandy Alderson, Tony Clark, Rob Manfred, Joe Torre, and Tom Werner. Manfred, having succeeded Selig as the Commissioner in 2015, instituted rule changes to MLB before the start of the 2015 MLB season to address pace of play, including having batters remain in the batters box and the installation of time clocks to limit the time spent around commercial breaks. In 2015, MLB had a committee discuss bringing back the bullpen car. 

Prior to the 2017 MLB season, the rules were amended to allow a manager to order an automatic intentional walk. MLB and the MLB Players Association (MLBPA) discussed the possibility of introducing the pitch clock at the major league level for the 2018 season. MLB opted against imposing it unilaterally, over the opposition of the MLBPA. Before the 2018 season, MiLB took major actions, including adding pitch clocks at all levels, beginning each extra inning with a runner on second base, and restricting the number of mound visits for full-season Class A through Triple-A teams. Also, the Arizona Diamondbacks of MLB announced they would introduce their first bullpen car in 2018.
Minor League Baseball expanded its pace of play initiatives in 2019 by requiring Double-A and Triple-A pitchers to face a minimum of three consecutive batters unless the side is retired or the pitcher becomes injured and is unable to continue playing. Also, the number of allowed mound visits was reduced: Class A (9 visits), Double-A (7 visits), and Triple-A (5 visits).

As an experimental step to accelerate pace of play, MLB implemented 20-second pitch clocks during spring training games in 2019.
  

After a successful trial in Low-A West in 2021, MLB allowed teams to use PitchCom, a wireless communications system, to request pitches starting in the 2022 season. Through their first 54 games in 2022, the New York Yankees played 25 games (about 47%) in less than three hours. In 2021, only about 25% of the Yankees' games finished in three hours or less.

On September 8, 2022, MLB announced a set of rules changes that will take effect in 2023, including the use of a pitch clock.

References

Further reading
 Pace of Play at MLB.com

Baseball rules
Baseball terminology